The Most Honourable Order of the Bath is an order of knighthood awarded by the sovereign of the United Kingdom and several Commonwealth realms. It is granted by the monarch on the advice of the Prime Minister and recognises military service and civilian merit; it is typically awarded to senior military officers and a select number of the most senior civil servants. Knights of the Bath were appointed in the medieval and early modern period on special occasions, such as the coronation of the monarch; their name derived from the practice of bathing as a purification ritual before knighthood. However, although medieval and early modern "knights of the bath" took precedence over Knights Bachelor, they were never a formally organised order. Charles II still made a number of appointments at his coronation in 1661, but the practice had largely ceased by the early 18th century. In 1725, George I, on the advice of his Prime Minister Robert Walpole, instituted the modern Order of the Bath to revive the medieval "order" and provide a new source of patronage for his government. As well as the sovereign, the new order had a Great Master and 36 Knights Companion.

In 1815, the order was split into military and civil divisions and the number of grades was expanded, with the most senior being Knight Grand Cross, the next being Knight Commander, and the lowest grade being Companion; this structure has remained largely unmodified, although in 1971 women were admitted to the order (those appointed to the highest two grades would be Dames Grand Cross and Dames Commander respectively). Limits to the number of appointments made to each grade have altered over time; as of 2018, there can be no more than 115 Knights or Dames Grand Cross (GCB), 328 Knights or Dames Commanders (KCB or DCB), and 1,815 Companions (CB) at any time. The most senior grades confer the status of knighthood on holders, although foreigners (who typically receive honorary awards) are not usually entitled to the style.

List of Knights and Dames Commander

References

Order of the Bath
Bath